José Olarra (1896–1948) was an Argentine actor.

Biography
Olarra starred in the acclaimed Silver Condor-winning 1943 film Juvenilia. 
Other notable films include Circus Cavalcade (1945), Vacations in the Other World (1942) and Cuando la primavera se equivoca (1944).

Selected filmography
 When the Heart Sings (1941)
 Gold in the Hand (1943)
 The Circus Cavalcade (1945)
 A Story of the Nineties (1949)

References

External links
 

Argentine male film actors
1896 births
1948 deaths